Reader's Digest Press was a United States publisher of the mid-1960s to early 1980s, owned by The Reader's Digest Association. It published full-length, original non-fiction books, often concerning military or political topics.  (It thus differed from the better-known Reader's Digest Condensed Books.) Its works were sometimes distributed by Thomas Y. Crowell Co.

Books published by Reader's Digest Press include Secrets & Spies: Behind the Scenes Stories of World War II in 1964. Covering the war from the Pearl Harbor attack of December 7, 1941, to Japan's surrender on August 15, 1945, this collection of espionage accounts and anecdotes included pieces by Walter Lord, Edwin Muller, Gordon W. Prange and others, and illustrations by Paul Calle and Guy Deel. Individual stories include "The Hunt for a Spy" and "Hitler's Undercover Invasion", accounts of German attempts at espionage inside the United States; "Jungle of Hidden Friends," a narrative of OSS agents who coalesced native Burmese warriors against Japanese forces in Burma; and "The Great Ambush", the story of the behind-the-lines battle for Italy's freedom from Nazi dominion. Other topics explored include Great Britain's secret transportation of its gold reserves to Canada in the threat of a German invasion; narrow escapes, such as the Great Escape from a German POW camp; and the repair of a crashed fighter plane by a company of Philippines-marooned American airmen for one final mission against Japan.

See also

 List of publishing houses

References

Companies with year of establishment missing
Companies with year of disestablishment missing
1970s establishments in the United States
1980s disestablishments in the United States
Publishing companies established in the 1970s
Defunct book publishing companies of the United States
Publishing companies disestablished in the 1980s
Press